Leslie Toluwani Adetokunbo Okikiola Ayomipo Adekoya (born 18 April 2004) is an Irish professional footballer who plays as a forward for Accrington Stanley.

Career
Adekoya is a youth product of Accrington Stanley scoring 20 goals in 28 appearances with the U18s in the 2021–22 season, and signed his first professional contract with the club on 26 July 2022. He joined Northern Premier League Division One West club Witton Albion on a month-long loan on 6 September 2022, where he made six senior league and cup appearances. Returning to Accrington Stanley, he made his professional debut with them as a late substitute in a 3-0 EFL League One loss to Fleetwood Town on 29 October 2022. He scored a late goal in a 3–1 loss to Leeds United in the fourth round of the 2022-23 FA Cup.

Career statistics

Personal life
Born in Ireland to Nigerian parents, Adekoya moved to England at a young age. He is eligible to represent England, Nigeria and Ireland internationally.

References

External links
 
 Witton Albion FC Profile

2004 births
Living people
Association footballers from Dublin (city)
Republic of Ireland association footballers
Irish people of Nigerian descent
Association football forwards
English Football League players
Accrington Stanley F.C. players
Witton Albion F.C. players
Northern Premier League players
Irish expatriate sportspeople in England
Black Irish sportspeople